Penny Lou Neer (born November 7, 1960) is a former American collegiate and Olympic athlete in discus throwing, basketball and softball.

A native of Hillsdale, Michigan, Neer came to the University of Michigan on a basketball scholarship and became a three-sport star. She earned a total of eight varsity letters at U-M in basketball, track and field, and softball. In three seasons on Michigan's varsity basketball team, Neer scored 456 points and recorded 64 blocks. During her junior year, she became U-M's first woman All-American in track and field, and as a senior, Neer became the first female athlete from the University of Michigan to win a national title in a track and field event—winning in the discus at the 1982 Association for Intercollegiate Athletics for Women (AIAW) outdoor championship.  Neer was a two-time AIAW All-American and a three-time Big Ten Conference discus champion, winning Big Ten championships in 1980, 1981 and 1982.  She was ranked second in the United States in the discus throw in 1985 and again in 1991 and was ranked in the top ten for eleven straight years from 1982 to 1992.  Neer also holds the Michigan discus record and was named to the Big Ten All-Decade team.

Neer did not make the 1984 or 1988 Olympic teams, but continued to compete in the discus and made the 1992 Olympic team at age 33. She was the first U-M woman to qualify for the Olympics in a field event.

Neer later became an MRP Analyst/Scheduler for Venture Industries. She was inducted into the University of Michigan Athletic Hall of Honor in 2002.

See also
 University of Michigan Athletic Hall of Honor
 Athletics at the 1992 Summer Olympics - Women's discus throw

References

External links
 
 

1960 births
Living people
American female discus throwers
American female shot putters
American women's basketball players
Michigan Wolverines women's track and field athletes
Michigan Wolverines women's basketball players
Michigan Wolverines softball players
Olympic track and field athletes of the United States
Athletes (track and field) at the 1992 Summer Olympics
Pan American Games track and field athletes for the United States
Pan American Games bronze medalists for the United States
Pan American Games medalists in athletics (track and field)
Athletes (track and field) at the 1983 Pan American Games
People from Hillsdale, Michigan
Basketball players from Michigan
Softball players from Michigan
Medalists at the 1983 Pan American Games